Nimbadon is an extinct genus of diprotodont marsupial, that lived from the Late Oligocene to the Miocene epoches. Many fossils have been found in the Riversleigh World Heritage property in north-western Queensland. Unlike most members of the family, it is thought to have an arboreal, rather than terrestrial lifestyle.

In 1990, skulls were unearthed in a previously unknown cave in the region.  Researchers estimate that the first species of Nimbadon first appeared about 25 million years ago and died out about 12 million years ago, perhaps from climate change-induced habitat loss.

Nimbadon lavarackorum
Nimbadon lavarackorum is described as being koala-like. It is known from as many as 24 well-articulated specimens. The species was a tree-dweller, mainly feeding on stems and leaves. The feet and claws were large, being superficially similar to those of the koala. They retracted their claws when walking.

References

External links
Australias lost kingdoms, Nimbodon.
Black K. H. and Hand. S 2010., Nimbadon crania and species boundaries, American Museum novitates, no. 3678
KAREN H. BLACK,* MICHAEL ARCHER, SUZANNE J. HAND, and HENK GODTHELP FIRST COMPREHENSIVE ANALYSIS OF CRANIAL ONTOGENY IN A FOSSIL MARSUPIAL—FROM A 15-MILLION-YEAR-OLD CAVE DEPOSIT IN NORTHERN AUSTRALIA
"Cave yields marsupial fossil haul". BBC News. 2010-07-19.
"Giant tree wombat discovery wins science prize" ABC News 2012-05-03

Prehistoric mammals of Australia
Prehistoric vombatiforms
Oligocene marsupials
Miocene marsupials
Riversleigh fauna
Fossil taxa described in 1993
Prehistoric marsupial genera